Bronson is both UK surname and a masculine given name. Notable people with the name include:

Surname:
Action Bronson ( born 1983 ), American rapper, chef, and television presenter
Alvin Bronson (1783–1881), American businessman and politician
Ben Bronson (born 1972), American football player
Betty Bronson (1906–1971), American television and film actress
Bryan Bronson (born 1972), American hurdler
Charles Bronson (née Charles Dennis Buchinsky, 1921–2003), American actor
Charles Bronson (prisoner) (born 1952 as Michael Gordon Peterson), British convicted prisoner
Deming Bronson (1894–1957), American army officer
Greene C. Bronson (1789–1863), American politician
Josiah Bronson (born 1997), American football player
Kristen Bronson Late 1990’s/2000’s top model. Minor role in Zoolander and Star Wars Episode 2. 
Lillian Bronson (1902–1995), American actress
Richard Bronson (born 1941), American mathematician
Richard "Skip" Bronson, American real estate developer
Ruth Muskrat Bronson (née Ruth Margaret Muskrat, 1897–1982), American Cherokee poet and activist
Po Bronson, American author

Given name:
Bronson Alcott, American teacher and writer, father of Louisa May Alcott
Bronson Arroyo, major league pitcher, member of the 2004 Boston Red Sox world series team
Bronson Barnes, Top 0.5% of all players on popular game Hypixel Skyblock
Bronson Koenig (born 1994), American basketball player
Bronson La Follette (1936-2018), American politician and lawyer
Bronson Pinchot, American actor
Bronson Sardinha, major league outfielder
Marko Vukcevich, also known as Bronson, an ex-member of the band Mushroomhead
Buronson (or Bronson), a Japanese comics writer

Fictional characters:
 Bronson, a fictional character in Mother 3
 Bronson Twist, a fictional character in Round the Twist
 Martha Bronson, a fictional recurring character in the American television sitcom Leave It to Beaver. 
 Tom Bronson, a fictional character in DC Comics.

English-language surnames
Masculine given names